The white-spectacled bulbul (Pycnonotus xanthopygos) is a member of the bulbul family. These birds live in fruit plantations, gardens, and cities. It is the most common member of the bulbul family in Palestine and Lebanon. In Turkey, it is mainly found in the coastal Mediterranean region, but its range extends from Patara/Gelemiş near Kaş in the west to Türkoğlu in the east. Breeding populations are found from Central and Southern Turkey to Western Syria, Lebanon, Israel, Western Jordan, Palestine, Sinai and western, central and southern Arabia.

Both sexes are similar; juveniles have a browner hood and less obvious eye-rings than the adults. The nest – a small cup of thin twigs, grass stems, leaves and moss – is generally located in bushes and lined with hair, shredded bark and small roots.

Taxonomy and systematics
The white-spectacled bulbul was originally described in the genus Ixos. The white-spectacled bulbul is considered to belong to a superspecies along with the Himalayan bulbul, white-eared bulbul, African red-eyed bulbul, Cape bulbul, and the common bulbul. Alternate names for the white-spectacled bulbul include the  several names used for other species (black-capped, dark-capped, spectacled and yellow-vented bulbul) and one name (white-eyed bulbul) shared with the cream-vented bulbul.

References 

Pycnonotus
Birds of the Middle East
Birds described in 1833
Taxa named by Christian Gottfried Ehrenberg
Taxa named by Wilhelm Hemprich